Faten Ahmed Hamama (  ; 27 May 1931 – 17 January 2015) was an Egyptian film and television actress and film producer. She was the first wife of Ezz El-Dine Zulficar. She made her screen debut in 1939, when she was only seven years old. Her earliest roles were minor, but her activity and gradual success helped to establish her as a distinguished Egyptian actress. Later revered as an icon in Egyptian cinema. In 1996, nine of the films she starred in were included in the Top hundred films in the history of Egyptian cinema by the cinema critics of Cairo International Film Festival.

After a seven-year hiatus from acting, Hamama returned in 2000 in what was a much anticipated television series, Wageh El Amar (وجه القمر, Face of the Moon). Hamama substantially helped in improving the cinema industry in Egypt and emphasizing the importance of women in cinema and Egyptian society. In 2000, she was selected as Star of the Century by the Egyptian Writers and Critics organization.

Early life and career

Faten Hamama was born in 1931 to an Egyptian Muslim lower middle class family in Mansoura, Egypt (according to her birth certificate), but she claimed to have been born in  the Abdin quarter of Cairo. She has an older brother, Mounir, a younger sister, Layla and a younger brother, Mazhar. Her aspiration for acting arose at an early age. When she was six years old, her father took her to the theater to see an Assia Dagher film; when the audience clapped for Assia, she told her father she felt they were clapping for her.

When she won a children's beauty pageant in Egypt, her father sent her picture to the director Mohamed Karim who was looking for a young female child to play the role of a small girl with the famous Egyptian actor and musician Mohamed Abdel Wahab in the film Youm Sai'd (يوم سعيد, A Happy Day, 1939). After an audition, Abdel Wahab decided she was the one he was looking for. After her role in the film, people called her "Egypt's own Shirley Temple". The director liked her acting and was impressed with her so much that he signed a contract with her father. Four years later, she was chosen by Kareem for another role with Abdel Wahab in the film Rossassa Fel Qalb (رصاصة في القلب, Bullet in the Heart, 1944) and in another film two years later, Dunya (دنيا, Universe, 1946). After her success, Hamama moved with her parents to Cairo and started her study at the High Institute of Acting in 1946.

Career
Youssef Wahbi, an Egyptian actor and director, recognised the young actress's talent so he offered her a lead role in the 1946 film Malak al-Rahma (ملاك الرحمة, Angel of Mercy). The film attracted widespread media attention, and Hamama, who was only 15 at the time, became famous for her melodramatic role. In 1949, Hamama had roles in three films with Wahbi: Korsi el-e'traf (كرسي الاعتراف, Chair of Confession), Al-Yateematain (اليتيمتين, The Two Orphans) and Sitt al-Bayt (ست البيت, Lady of the House). All were successful films.

The 1950s were the beginning of the golden age of the Egyptian cinema industry, and Hamama played a significant part. In 1950, she starred alongside Mahmoud Zulfikar in the fantasy film; Akhlaq lil baye (أخلاق للبيع, Virtue for Sale, 1950). In 1951, she starred in the film Lak Yawm Ya Zalem (لك يوم يا ظالم, Your Day will Come) which was nominated at the Cannes Film Festival for the Prix International award. She also played lead roles in Yousef Shaheen's Baba Ameen (بابا أمين, Ameen, my Father, 1950) and Sira` Fi al-Wadi (صراع في الوادي, Struggle in the Valley, 1954)l, which was a strong nominee at the 1954 Cannes Film Festival for the Prix International award. Hamama is also known for having played the lead role in the first Egyptian mystery film Al-Manzel Raqam 13 (المنزل رقم 13, House Number 13). In 1959, she starred in the Ezz El-Dine Zulficar’s romantic classic, Bain Al Atlal (بين الأطلال, Among the Ruins) with her favorite 1950s co-star Emad Hamdy and Egypt's new rising leading man Salah Zulfikar. In 1963, she received an award for her role in the political film La Waqt Lel Hob (لا وقت للحب, No Time for Love). Hamama was also able to make it to Hollywood; in 1963 she had a role in the crime film, Cairo.

In 1947, Hamama married actor/film director Ezz El-Dine Zulficar while filming the Abu Zayd al-Hilali (أبو زيد الهلالي) film. They started a production company which produced the film Maw`ed Ma` al-Hayat (موعد مع الحياة, Date with Life) in which she starred. This film earned her the title of the "lady of the Arabic screen". She divorced Zulficar in 1954. One year later, she married  Egyptian film star Omar Sharif. Meanwhile, Hamama continued to act in films directed by her first husband. In 1954, while filming a Youssef Chahine film, Struggle in the Valley, Hamama refused to have the Egyptian actor Shukry Sarhan as a co-star, and Chahine offered Omar Sharif the role. Omar had just graduated from college then and was working for his father; Hamama accepted him as her co-star. Hamama had never agreed to act any scene involving a kiss in her career, but she accepted. They fell in love, and Omar Sharif married her. This marriage started a new era of Hamama's career, in which the couple made many films together. Omar Sharif and Faten Hamama were the romantic leads of Ayyamna al-Holwa (أيامنا الحلوة, Our Sweet Days), Ard al-Salam (أرض السلام, Land of Peace), La Anam (لا أنام, Sleepless) and Sayyidat al-Qasr (سيدة القصر, The Lady of the Palace). Their last film together before their divorce was Ezz El-Dine Zulficar's Nahr al-Hob (نهر الحب, The River of Love) in 1960.

Controversy in the late 1960s

Hamama left Egypt from 1966 to 1971, claiming that she was being harassed by Egyptian Intelligence. She had been a supporter of the 1952 Revolution, but later became an opponent of the Free Officers and their oppressive regime. She said they were "asking her to cooperate" but she apologized and refused. In consequence, she was forbidden to travel or participate in film festivals. She was only able to leave Egypt after many serious disputes, where she lived in Paris, London and Lebanon.

While she was away, then President Gamal Abdel Nasser asked famous writers, journalists and friends to try to convince her to return to Egypt. He called her a "national treasure" and even awarded her an honorary decoration in 1965. However, she did not return until 1971, after Nasser's death. Following her return she played roles conveying messages of democracy. Her first film after her return to Egypt was alongside the Egyptian leading movie star Salah Zulfikar in the 1971 TV short film named Witch (ساحرة, Sahira), and in the same year, she starred in the 1971 film Thin Thread (الخيط الرفيع, Al Khait Al Rafie). She often criticized the laws in Egypt in her films. In the 1972 film Imbratoriyat Meem (إمبراطورية ميم, The Empire of M), Hamama presented a pro-democratic point of view and received an award from the Soviet Union of Women in the Moscow International Festival. Her most significant film was Salah Zulfikar Films production Oridu Hallan (أريد حلاً, I Want a Solution). In this film, she criticised laws governing marriage and divorce in Egypt. After the film, the Egyptian government abrogated a law that forbade wives from divorcing their husbands, therefore allowing khul'.

Later career
As Hamama aged, her acting roles declined and she made fewer films compared to earlier in her career, but nevertheless her films were successful. She made her first television appearances in her late career. She starred in the TV mini-series Dameer Ablah Hikmat (ضمير أبلة حكمت, Mrs. Hikmat's Conscience).

After 1993, her career stalled. It was not until 2000 that she returned in the successful TV mini-series Wajh ِِal-Qamar which was broadcast on 23 TV channels in the Middle East. In this mini-series, Hamama portrayed and criticized many problems in Egyptian and Middle Eastern society. Despite some criticisms, the mini-series received much praise and acclaim. Hamama was awarded the Egyptian Best TV Actor of the Year and the mini-series won the Best TV Series Award in the Egyptian Radio and Television Festival. She entered history as the highest-paid actress in an Egyptian television miniseries until 2006, when another actress was paid more.

Before the 1950s, Hamama had leading roles in 30 films, in which she often played the role of a weak, empathetic, poor girl. After the 1950s, Hamama was in search of her real identity and was trying to establish herself as a distinct figure. During this period, her choice of material and roles was somewhat limited. However, film producers soon capitalised on her popularity with audiences in local and Middle Eastern markets. She began to play realistic, strong women, such as in Sira' Fi Al-Wadi (صراع في الوادي, Struggle in the Valley, 1954) where she portrayed a rich man's daughter who, contrary to stereotype, was a realistic woman who helped and supported the poor. In the 1952 Mahmoud Zulfikar's production Miss Fatmah (الأستاذة فاطمة), Hamama starred as a law student who believed women were as important as men in society.

In Imbratoriyat Meem (امبراطورية ميم, The Empire M), she played the role of a widow who takes care of her large family and suffers hardship. Her most influential film was Oridu Hallan (أريد حلا, I Want a Solution) which criticized the laws of marriage and divorce in Egypt. A law in Egypt that forbade Khul' (خلع) – a divorce initiated by the wife – was annulled immediately afterwards.

Most critics agree that Hamama's most challenging role was in the 1959 film Doaa al-Karawan (دعاء الكروان, The Nightingale's Prayer), which is considered to be one of the best Egyptian films. It is based on the novel of the same name by the prominent Egyptian writer Taha Hussein. In this film, Hamama played the role of Amnah, a young woman who seeks revenge from her uncle for the honour killing of her sister. After this film, Hamama carefully picked her roles. In 1960, she starred in the film Nahr Hob (نهر الحب, The River of Love) of Ezz El-Dine Zulficar  which was based on Leo Tolstoy's well known novel Anna Karenina and in 1961, she played the lead role in the film La Tutf'e al-Shams (لا تطفئ الشمس, Don't Turn Off the Sun) based on the novel by Ihsan Abdel Quddous.

Death and funeral
Faten Hamama died on 17 January 2015, aged 83. Her son Tarek Sharif did not state the cause of her death.

Tributes soon poured in from across the film industry following her death, as well as from government figures. Egyptian president Abdel Fattah el-Sisi, who was on a visit abroad, mourned her death and sent an envoy to her funeral, while a statement from his office described her as a person of "high creative value." "She will remain a symbol of the genuine Egyptian art and commitment to its ethics," the statement added. The Ministry of Culture ordered a two-day period of mourning and a halt in all artistic activity. Secretary-General of the Arab League, Nabil el-Arabi, called her a "symbol of refined Egyptian and Arab art". The country's dailies gave her prominence in their front pages, with newspaper Al-Akhbar displaying "Farewell to the Lady of the Arabic Screen" as a headline.

The funeral was attended by thousands of mourners who blocked traffic around the mosque where the ceremony was being held. The event was broadcast live on a private channel. Attendees included Minister of Culture Gaber Asfour, former presidential candidate Amr Moussa, as well as several actors and actresses, but not Omar Sharif (who was suffering from Alzheimer's disease, dying at the same age less than six months later). King Mohammed VI of Morocco assigned his country's ambassador in Cairo to attend the funeral.

Personal life
While filming Abu Zayd al-Hilali (أبو زيد الهلالى) in 1947, she and director Ezz El-Dine Zulficar fell in love and wed. The marriage lasted for seven years. They divorced in 1954. Hamama has said that her love for Zulficar was little more than a student's admiration and love for a teacher. The two remained friends, and Hamama continued to star in his films after the divorce. They had one child, a daughter, Nadia Zulficar.

In 1954, Hamama chose Omar Sharif to co-star with her in a film. In this film, she uncharacteristically agreed to a romantic scene involving a kiss. During the filming, they fell in love. Sharif converted to Islam and married her. The couple co-starred in many films. However, after nearly two decades together, the couple divorced in 1974; they had one son, Tarek Sharif. The couple also have two grandsons from Tarek, Omar Sharif Jr. and Karem Sharif. Omar Sharif Jr. followed in his grandfather's footsteps and now acts in the U.S. in small roles and is an LGBTQ activist.

Hamama later married Mohamed Abdel Wahab Mahmoud, an Egyptian doctor. They resided in Cairo until her death on 17 January 2015 following a short illness.

Hamama was fluent in French, as she did an interview in French in Lebanon in 1963. She was a practicing Muslim.

Awards, nominations and honours

Throughout Hamama's career, she received numerous accolades for best actress, and was nominated for the Cannes Film Festival’s Prix International for her role in 1950's Your Day Will Come. She received her first award in 1951 for her role in I'm the Past, which was presented to her by different venues, including the Egyptian Catholic Center for Cinema. The country's Ministry of Guidance also awarded her the title of Best Actress in both 1955 and 1961. These were followed by many different awards for best actress from various national and international events. International ones included special awards at the first Tehran International Film Festival in 1972 for her role in The Thin Thread, and again at the 1977 Tehran Film Festival for her role in Mouths and Rabbits. In 1973, she received the Special Award at the Moscow International Film Festival for her role in Empire M.   Hamama's other international accolades included the Best Actress awards at the Jakarta Film Festival in 1963 for her role in The Open Door, and at the Carthage Film Festival in 1988 for her role in Bitter Days, Nice Days.

Hamama was also a recipient of the Lebanese Order of Merit in 1984 for her role in The Night of Fatma's Arrest. She was later presented lifetime achievement awards, including one at the Montpellier Mediterranean Film Festival in 1993, and another at the Dubai International Film Festival in 2009. In 2001, the Egyptian Writers and Critics Organization chose her as "Star of the Century" at the Alexandria International Film Festival, honouring her lengthy career in Egyptian cinema.

Hamama was also honoured on several other occasions. Some of those include:
Decoration of Creativity of First Degree, from Lebanese Prime Minister Prince Khaled Chehab (1953)
Order of the Republic of First Degree for Art, from Egyptian President Gamal Abdel Nasser (1965)
Decoration of the State of the First Order, from Egyptian President Anwar Sadat (1976)
Decoration of the Cedar, from Lebanese President Émile Lahoud (2001)
Decoration of Intellectual Competence, from King Mohammed VI of Morocco (2001)
On 14 June 2013, the American University of Beirut awarded Faten Hamama with an honorary doctorate. The University President Peter Dorman introduced the Egyptian actress as an “icon, legend, and luminary.” However, “I feel a great happiness, today, greater than any gift that I have ever received. Currently, there is a massive attack on art, culture and anything related to literature. So this honorary doctorate will not only make me happy, but will bring happiness to all the artists and cultured people in Egypt and the Arab world.” said Hamama.
Order of Sciences and Arts, 2014
A Google Doodle on 27 May 2016 commemorated Hamama's 85th birth anniversary.

Selected filmography

Film

Television

See also
Bahiga Hafez
Fatima Rushdi
Nadia Lutfi
 Lists of Egyptians
 Top 100 Egyptian films
Egyptian films of the 1950s
Egyptian films of the 1960s

References

Sources

Published sources

Online sources

External links

 

1931 births
2015 deaths
20th-century Egyptian actresses
Egyptian film actresses
Egyptian film producers
Egyptian Muslims
Egyptian television actresses
People from Mansoura, Egypt